Fiji competed at the 2019 World Aquatics Championships in Gwangju, South Korea from 12 to 28 July.

Swimming

Fiji entered four swimmers.

Men

Women

References

Nations at the 2019 World Aquatics Championships
Fiji at the World Aquatics Championships
2019 in Fijian sport